The NPL State League 1 South Australia is the second tier state-level football (soccer) competition in South Australia, ranked third tier in the national pyramid. The league are part of the National Premier Leagues (NPL) structure implemented by Football Federation Australia in 2012. It is conducted by the Football Federation South Australia (FFSA), the state's governing body. After the reforming of the South Australian football league structure in 2012, the league increased its participants from 10 clubs to 16. The FFSA has announced a restructuring of the league format in South Australia for the 2016 to 2018 seasons, moving from a 2 tiered system to a 3 tiered system with the introduction of a new 3rd division, which will reduce the participants in the State League down to 12.

A-League team Adelaide United entered their youth team in the 2015 season.

Change of format
The State League will reduce from a 16 team competition to a 12 team competition from the 2016 season, as part of a restructuring of the league format, moving from a 2 tiered system to a 3 tiered system with the introduction of a new 3rd division called State League 2.

2023 State League 1 Clubs

Honours

Note: Prior to 2012, the State League was the third tier competition in South Australia.

See also
Football (soccer) in South Australia

References

External links
 Football SA Official website

3
Sports leagues established in 2005
2005 establishments in Australia